Pawel Pogorzelski (born 1979) is a Polish-born Canadian cinematographer, known for his work with director Ari Aster.

Pogorzelski was born in 1979 in Włocławek, Poland but moved to Montreal with his family when he was 2. He studied at Concordia University, receiving an undergraduate degree in media communication. He moved to Los Angeles in 2008, where he studied at the American Film Institute Conservatory.

Pogorzelski garnered critical acclaim for his work on the 2018 psychological horror film Hereditary, directed by Ari Aster. They would work together again on the 2019 film Midsommar, for which he received a nomination for the Independent Spirit Award for Best Cinematography at the 35th Independent Spirit Awards. In 2021, he was the director of photography for the action film Nobody and the Hulu horror film False Positive. In 2022, he served as cinematographer for the DC Comics film Blue Beetle.

Filmography

References

External links
Pawel Pogorzelski at the Internet Movie Database

1980 births
AFI Conservatory alumni
Canadian cinematographers
Concordia University alumni
Polish cinematographers
Polish emigrants to Canada
Living people